Appleton is an unincorporated community in Licking County, in the U.S. state of Ohio.

History
Appleton was laid out in 1832. A post office was established at Appleton in 1836, and remained in operation until 1904.

References

Unincorporated communities in Licking County, Ohio
1832 establishments in Ohio
Populated places established in 1832
Unincorporated communities in Ohio